In mathematics, the geometric topology is a topology one can put on the set H of hyperbolic 3-manifolds of finite volume.

Use
Convergence in this topology is a crucial ingredient of hyperbolic Dehn surgery, a fundamental tool in the theory of hyperbolic 3-manifolds.

Definition
The following is a definition due to Troels Jorgensen:  

A sequence  in H converges to M in H if there are

 a sequence of positive real numbers  converging to 0, and 
 a sequence of -bi-Lipschitz diffeomorphisms 

where the domains and ranges of the maps are the -thick parts of either the 's or M.

Alternate definition
There is an alternate definition due to Mikhail Gromov.  Gromov's topology utilizes the Gromov-Hausdorff metric and is defined on pointed hyperbolic 3-manifolds.  One essentially considers better and better bi-Lipschitz homeomorphisms on larger and larger balls.  This results in the same notion of convergence as above as the thick part is always connected; thus, a large ball will eventually encompass all of the thick part.

On framed manifolds
As a further refinement, Gromov's metric can also be defined on framed hyperbolic 3-manifolds.  This gives nothing new but this space can be explicitly identified with torsion-free Kleinian groups with the Chabauty topology.

See also
Algebraic topology (object)

References
 William Thurston, The geometry and topology of 3-manifolds, Princeton lecture notes (1978-1981).
 Canary, R. D.; Epstein, D. B. A.; Green, P., Notes on notes of Thurston.  Analytical and geometric aspects of hyperbolic space (Coventry/Durham, 1984), 3--92, London Math. Soc. Lecture Note Ser., 111, Cambridge Univ. Press, Cambridge, 1987.

3-manifolds
Hyperbolic geometry
Topological spaces